Uroš Vidović (born 9 June 1994) is a Serbian football midfielder who plays for Serbian SuperLiga club Radnički 1923 Kragujevac.

Honours
Radnički Kragujevac
Serbian League West: 2016–17

References

External links
 
 Uroš Vidović stats at utakmica.rs 
 

1994 births
Living people
Sportspeople from Kragujevac
Association football midfielders
Serbian footballers
Serbian expatriate footballers
FK Radnički 1923 players
Hong Kong Rangers FC players
Serbian First League players
Serbian SuperLiga players
Expatriate footballers in Hong Kong
Hong Kong First Division League players
Serbian expatriate sportspeople in Hong Kong